Line 22 of the Shenzhen Metro is an express line under planning, which will connect the districts of Futian and Longhua for 38 kilometers and 23 stations. Construction is planned to begin in 2023. The first phase of Line 22 has entered Phase V planning, and will run from Shangsha in Futian District to Liguang in Longhua District, with 21 stations and 34.2 kilometers of track. The line is proposed to use 8 car type A trains. It is proposed to extend into Dongguan in long term planning.

Stations (Phase 1)

References

Shenzhen Metro lines
Transport infrastructure under construction in China